Baliwag Transit is the one of the major bus company in the Philippines with offices and terminals in various parts of Luzon that mainly services routes to and from Metro Manila and Central Luzon. It is named after the town of Baliwag (now a city), where it originated.

History
Baliwag Transit, Inc. was established by Maria Victoria Santiago Vda. de Tengco (popularly known in Baliwag as "Viuda" or "Nanay"), a native of Baliwag and Hagonoy, Bulacan. Prior to the establishment of the bus company in the 1960s, she had a hat business in Baliwag, this becoming the source of the logo of the bus company. The company grew as years went by and became a member of the Baliwag Group of Companies. The children and grandchildren of Doña Victoria continue to manage the company and is currently presided by her eldest son, Joselito S. Tengco.

Stations and vehicles

Like other bus companies in the Philippines with exclusive terminals, Baliwag Transit, Inc. has its own stations like in the city of San Jose and Cabanatuan, Nueva Ecija, also in Baliwag, Malolos and Hagonoy, Bulacan and in Metro Manila like Cubao, Quezon City and Grace Park, Caloocan. These are located in vital points along the bus routes, where potential passengers can easily converge for boarding.

In 2009, Baliwag Transit opened a subsidiary company, Golden Bee Transport and Logistics Corp.,  which services the routes Pasay-Cubao to Baliwag, Cabanatuan, and San Jose, Nueva Ecija, and vice versa.

They opened their Pasay Terminal in Zone 16, Don Carlos St., Brgy. 164, Pasay on December 14, 2014, owned by the Baliwag Transit and their sister company, Golden Bee Transport and Logistics Corporation.

Baliwag Transit, Inc. and Golden Bee Transport and Logistics Corp. is utilizing Hino, Nissan Diesel, Daewoo, King Long, Higer, Iveco, MAN, and Mitsubishi Fuso as their current and historical units.

Fare classes
Ordinary fare (3 x 2 seating; 61 to 66 passenger seats)
Regular air conditioned (2 x 2 seating; 49 to 53 passenger seats and 3 x 2 56 and 66 passenger seats)
Deluxe Class (2 x 2 seating; 45 passenger seats with restroom equipped for Cabanatuan and San Jose Nueva Ecija Trips)

All Baliwag Transit buses provide Wi-Fi access.

Terminals

Baliwag Transit

Central Luzon
 Aurora
 Dingalan
 Baler
 Bulacan
 Angat
 Baliwag
 Hagonoy
 San Rafael
 San Miguel
 Nueva Ecija
 Bongabon
 Cabanatuan
 Cuyapo
 Gabaldon
 Guimba
 Licab
 Palayan
 Pantabangan
 Papaya
 Rizal
 San Antonio
 San Jose
 Talugtug
 Pampanga
 Guagua
 San Fernando
 Tarlac
 Tarlac City
 La Paz

Ilocos Region
 Pangasinan
 San Quintin

Golden Bee Transport and Logistics Corp.

Metro Manila
Metro Manila
Divisoria

Central Luzon
Bulacan
Baliwag
Hagonoy
Nueva Ecija
Cabanatuan 
San Jose 
Pampanga
Guagua
San Fernando (Robinson's Starmills)

Routes and destinations

Metro Manila
Grace Park, Caloocan 
Cubao, Quezon City 
Pasay Rotonda 
Divisoria, Manila

Provincial destinations
Dingalan, Aurora
Baler, Aurora
Baliwag
Hagonoy, Bulacan (Shared with Golden Bee Transport, Inc.)
Guiguinto, Bulacan (Shared with Golden Bee Transport, Inc.)
Malolos, Bulacan (Shared with Golden Bee Transport, Inc.)
Meycauayan, Bulacan
San Miguel, Bulacan (Shared with Golden Bee Transport, Inc.)
Apalit, Pampanga
Guagua, Pampanga
San Fernando, Pampanga near SM City Pampanga and Robinsons Starmills
Angeles, Pampanga (Ayala Marquee Mall)
Dau/Mabalacat Bus Terminal, Mabalacat (ordinary and air-conditioned buses only except deluxe)
San Luis, Pampanga
Aliaga, Nueva Ecija
Cabanatuan (via Bulacan/SCTEX)
Gapan, Nueva Ecija
General Tinio, Nueva Ecija
Laur, Nueva Ecija
Licab, Nueva Ecija via Victoria, Tarlac (Shared with Golden Bee Transport, Inc.)
Quezon, Nueva Ecija
Pantabangan, Nueva Ecija 
Rizal, Nueva Ecija
San Antonio, Nueva Ecija (via Gapan, Nueva Ecija)
San Jose, Nueva Ecija via Bulacan/SCTEX (Shared with  Golden Bee Transport, Inc.) 
Umingan, Pangasinan
Tarlac City, Tarlac
La Paz, Tarlac
Palayan, Nueva Ecija
Gabaldon, Nueva Ecija
Zaragoza, Nueva Ecija
Angat, Bulacan
Camiling, Tarlac
San Quintin, Pangasinan via San Jose, Nueva Ecija (re-opened)

Inter-provincial route
Tarlac City–Cabanatuan

Former routes
Guimba, Nueva Ecija via Victoria, Tarlac (route given to Golden Bee Transport)
Aparri, Cagayan
Tuguegarao, Cagayan
Jones, Isabela
Echague, Isabela
Santiago, Isabela
Cauayan, Isabela
Solano, Nueva Vizcaya

Gallery

See also
 List of bus companies of the Philippines
 Five Star Bus Company

References

External links
 

Bus companies of the Philippines
Companies based in Bulacan